Parichaya is a 2009 Indian Kannada-language film directed by K Sanjay and Produced by  S G Krishna Murthy starring Tarun Chandra and Rekha in the lead roles.

Cast

 Tarun Chandra as Jayanth
 Rekha as Nirmala a.k.a. Nimmi
 Sindhu Lokanath
 Shally Khatri 
 Avinash
 Shobhraj
 Anand
 Kashi
 Chidanand
 Bhargavi Narayan
 Sudha Belawadi

Music
The music was composed by Jassie Gift.

Reception

Critical response 

R G Vijayasarathy of Rediff.com scored the film at 2 out of 5 stars and says "Tarun is good in songs and dances but is expressionless in the emotional scenes. The dubbing work done by actor Dileep Raj does not suit his body language. Rekha should never weep like this in any film! Her new look is attractive, but she is still to attain a maturity in her performance. Avinash and Shobharaj provide some relief with their dialogues particularly Avinash who imitates a well known film director. Other artists are just passable". A critic from Deccan Herald wrote  "A dragged out climax and the Kailash Kher song do mar the pleasure but chartbuster numbers shot well, dialogue and artwork that know today’s youths’ pulse all deserve a pat on the back. ‘Parichaya’ is one film worth knowing". A critic from Bangalore Mirror wrote  "The first half of the film runs like a breeze. A trimmer second half would have taken Parichaya a notch higher. Tarun’s acting is not up to the standard of Dilip Raj who has dubbed for him. Parichaya is still worth getting acquainted with".

References

2000s Kannada-language films
2009 films